Q44 may refer to:
 Q44 (New York City bus)
 Ad-Dukhan, a surah of the Quran